Wlodzimierz Zonn (14 July 1905, Vilnius – 28 February 1975) was a Polish astronomer. He studied at the University of Stefan Batory at Wilno, where he later worked as a professor.

From 1950, Zonn was director of Astronomical Observatory of the University of Warsaw. For many years (1952 - 1955 and 1963 - 1973), he was President of the Polish Astronomical Society.

Awards and recognition

In 1954 he was awarded with Knight's Cross of the Order of Polonia Restituta.

References

1905 births
1975 deaths
Scientists from Vilnius
People from Vilensky Uyezd
20th-century Polish astronomers
Recipients of the Order of Polonia Restituta (1944–1989)